Humberto González (born March 25, 1966) is a Mexican former professional boxing champion. He held the WBC three times, IBF and Lineal Jr. Flyweight titles. He was nicknamed Chiquita.

Professional career 
Gonzalez made his professional boxing debut on September 1, 1984 in Mexico City with a four round decision win over Jorge Ortega Perez. Little over three months later, he had his first knockout win, as he beat Narciso Perez in the first round.

The win over Perez began a streak of 18 knockout wins in a row for Gonzalez, mostly against little known Mexican opposition. The streak lasted until September 26, 1987, when he outpointed Mexican Jr. Flyweight champion Jorge Cano over 12 rounds to win the national title in Cancún.

In 1988, he won four fights, all by knockout. He retained the national belt against Jose Luis Zepeda in six rounds at Tijuana, and Javier Vazquez, beaten in five at Mexico City.

His next fight, on June 25, 1989, brought two firsts to his career: Celebrated in Chonju, South Korea, it was his first fight abroad. Being for the WBC world Jr. Flyweight championship, it was also his first world title try. Gonzalez outpointed world champion Yul-Woo Lee over 12 rounds to crown himself world champion. On December 9, he again fought in South Korea, retaining his world championship against former champion and future hall of fame member Jung-Koo Chang by a decision in 12. Chang had previously defended the same title a then division record 15 times before vacating it following a brief retirement the year prior.

In 1990, Gonzalez retained the title four times, including a win against future champion Francisco Tejedor, but on December 19, he suffered a shocking defeat to Rolando Pascua, a boxer who was unknown to most boxing experts, in Inglewood. The knockout in round six suffered by Gonzalez that night cost him the world title.

After a win in 1991, Gonzalez recovered the world title, by defeating the man who had taken the world championship away from Pascua: Melchor Cob Castro. Gonzalez and Castro met on June 3 at Las Vegas, and Gonzalez won a 12 round decision.

In 1992, he retained the title four times, beating Castro in a rematch, reigning Olympic flyweight gold medalist Kim Kwang-sun, Domingo Sosa and former world champion Napa Kiatwanchai.

By then, talks about a superfight between him and IBF world champion Michael Carbajal were common among boxing fans. The fight, which came on March 13, 1993, was the first million-dollar fight in Jr. Flyweight boxing history (both fighters were guaranteed one million dollars in earnings) and also the first Jr. Flyweight fight in history to head a Pay Per View boxing card. In front of many Hollywood stars and thousands of fans at the arena, Gonzalez dropped Carbajal in rounds two and five, but Carbajal recovered to knock Gonzalez out in round seven. He finished the year with two ten round decision wins, including one against Pablo Tiznado, a boxer who also fought against Alex Sanchez.

Carbajal and Gonzalez met in a rematch February 19, 1994 at Inglewood, and the second time around, Gonzalez became a three time world Jr. Flyweight champion by beating Carbajal by decision in 12. With that win, he joined an exclusive group of boxers who have been world champions three times or more in the same division, alongside such others as Muhammad Ali, Carlos De León, Evander Holyfield and Sugar Ray Robinson. Gonzalez won two more fights, one a non-title bout, and the other a title defense versus Juan Domingo Córdoba. Then, on November 12 of the same year, he and Carbajal had a rubber match, this time in Mexico City. Gonzalez again prevailed, on points over 12 rounds.

After retaining the title once in 1995, on July 15 of that year, he fought for the last time. Again, he dropped his rival, Saman Sorjaturong, a couple of times before being knocked out in round seven to lose his world title.

Retirement 
Immediately after the fight with Sorjaturong, he announced he was retiring, to pursue another dream of his: to become a successful businessman in Mexico City. Gonzalez had a record of 43 wins and 3 losses as a professional boxer, with 30 wins by knockout.

Life after boxing 
Gonzalez has stayed retired ever since, and he has been able to open three meat markets in Mexico. He is a part-time butcher in his shops, and has been able to reach the business success he dreamed about.

Trivia 
His first fight with Carbajal and his fight with Sorjaturong were both chosen as 1993 and 1995's Fight of the Year by The Ring. The Ring also placed Carbajal and Gonzalez on their list of the 100 greatest punchers of all time.

Both Humberto González and former rival Michael Carbajal were elected into the International Boxing Hall of Fame in 2006.

He earned many admirers during his professional boxing career. Female boxer Delia Gonzalez was one of them, and is nicknamed Chikita after Humberto.

Professional boxing record

See also 
List of light flyweight boxing champions
List of WBC world champions
List of IBF world champions
List of Mexican boxing world champions

References

External links 
 
Humberto González - CBZ Profile

|-

|-

1966 births
People from Nezahualcóyotl
International Boxing Federation champions
Living people
International Boxing Hall of Fame inductees
Boxers from the State of Mexico
Mexican businesspeople
World Boxing Council champions
World light-flyweight boxing champions
World boxing champions
Mexican male boxers